Lithia Motors, Inc. is an American nationwide automotive dealership group headquartered in Medford, Oregon. It is the third largest new vehicle automotive dealership group in the United States, after AutoNation and Penske Automotive Group. As of May 2022, Lithia operates 267 stores in 24 states, and 14 in Canada. Lithia Motors employs approximately 21,150 people.

In 2015, Lithia Motors broke into the Fortune 500 list at #482, making it one of only three Oregon-based companies in the Fortune 500. This followed a year that saw the acquisition of the DCH Auto Group, one of the 10 largest dealer groups in the country, with 27 dealerships, before being purchased by Lithia Motors.  In 2016, Lithia climbed to #346 and that same year made the Fortune 500 List of Top Ten Companies with the biggest jump in rank on the Fortune 500. As of 2018, Lithia is ranked #294 on the Fortune 500.

History 
Lithia Motors began in 1946 when Walt DeBoer opened a single car dealership in Ashland, Oregon. In the first year the five person company sold 14 cars. In 1968, Walt's son, Sidney DeBoer, took over the business and incorporated Lithia Motors Inc. Sidney reorganized the business and in 1970 purchased a Dodge dealership in Medford. With this, Lithia's base of operation moved to Medford and grew to a total of five stores with 19 franchises by 1990.

In December 1996, the company went public, trading on the New York Stock Exchange with an IPO of $11 per share. By 2003, Lithia had revenues of $2.5 billion from its 84 dealerships while employing just over 5,500 people. The company had increased dealerships to 88 by 2005. Lithia was fined $500,000 by the state of Alaska in 2006 for charging car buyers illegal document preparation fees at their Alaska dealerships. That year, they also settled with the Equal Employment Opportunity Commission for workplace discrimination. In early 2007, Lithia developed plans to build a  auto mall north of downtown Medford and to build a new corporate headquarters in downtown Medford. The Chrysler Jeep Dodge store moved to the auto mall in September 2007, but the project was put on hold for seven years because the recession hit shortly after. In late 2014, Lithia moved their Honda, Nissan, BMW, and Volkswagen stores to the auto mall. The group's Toyota store, which the group had planned to move to the auto mall, instead went through a $1.5 million renovation in 2013 and stayed on their 5-acre site in downtown Medford.
In 2010, it was reported that with the backing of two lenders, "the Commons," a mixed-use building with Lithia Headquarters as the largest tenant, was a "go" and could proceed with construction. According to an article by The Mail Tribune, "Lithia partnered with the Medford Urban Renewal Agency to create The Commons, a revitalization project that includes the headquarters and another $14 million in infrastructure and three park blocks paid for with MURA dollars. Lithia employees moved into their new headquarters in late 2012. In January 2014, the Commons building was awarded Silver Leadership in Energy and Environmental Design (LEED) Certification by the U.S. Green Building Council. Lithia has been the recipient of numerous awards, including Sports Illustrated's All-Star Dealer Award in 1990 and Time's Quality Dealer Award in 1997, 2016 Top Workplace-Oregon Award, 2016 Automotive News Best Dealerships to Work For and 2016 Fortune 500-40th Fastest Growing Company. In 2018, 10 Lithia Motors stores were named "Best Dealerships to Work For" by Automotive News. Cox Automotive awarded Lithia Motors' BMW of Ramsey, New Jersey store with the 2019 Cox Automotive Leader in Sustainability Award, citing outstanding community contributions and sustainable programs including waste reduction, water conservation and energy consumption.

With the acquisition of the DCH Auto Group in late 2014, Lithia expanded to 139 stores in 14 states across the US, Hawaii, and Alaska.

In September 2016, Lithia Motors announced that they were acquiring Greiner Ford-Lincoln in Casper, WY.

In September 2016, Lithia Motors partnered with Carbone Auto Group in New York and Vermont, bringing the Lithia Motors store count to 152.

In May 2017, Lithia Motors announced that they had acquired Baierl Auto Group in Pittsburgh, increasing their total store count to 160 and collision center count to 22.

In August 2017, Lithia Motors acquired Downtown Los Angeles Auto Group ("DTLA"), bringing the Lithia store count to 167.

In February 2018, Lithia Motors' store count grew to 179 after their acquisition of Day Automotive Group out of Monroeville, Pennsylvania.

In March 2018, Lithia Motors acquired Prestige Auto Stores in Bergen County, New Jersey bringing the Lithia store count to 185.

In February 2021, a source reported Lithia Motors was in talks to acquire the Suburban Collection dealer chain in Michigan. Suburban reported revenues of $2.7 billion in 2019. Later in April of the same year, the company acquired New Jersey dealership Planet Honda of Union, which is expected to add $230 million in annual revenue.

Lithia Motors pledged to increase annual revenue through acquisitions by about $20 billion over a five-year period in 2020. in early 2021, the company has added roughly $6.5 billion to its annual revenue, placing it about one-third of the way towards the company's target, according to CFO Tina Miller, currently in charge over the project. The success of the project is in part attributed to Lithia's e-commerce platform Driveway, which facilitates online used car sales with its inventory coming from dealer lots owned by Lithia.

Product 
Lithia sells new cars from General Motors, Chrysler, Toyota, Honda, Jaguar, Land Rover, BMW, Volkswagen, Mazda, and Porsche among others. New cars make up 58% of auto sales, with used cars making up the other 42%. Additional revenues come from auto repair at the dealerships, financing, and insurance sales.

In 2013 Lithia was named No. 9 on Automotive News' list of the 125 largest U.S. dealership groups, with retail new-vehicle sales of 56,960 units in 2012. In used-vehicle sales it also ranks No. 9, with retail used-vehicle sales of 49,067 in 2012.

The company received a Global Automotive Shareholder Value Awards presented by PwC and Automotive News in 2015 the sixth consecutive year for Lithia, followed by a three-year award in 2016. The awards are given to companies to recognize the highest shareholder returns within one-year and three-year periods among Global Vehicle Manufacturers, Global Automotive Suppliers and U.S. Automotive Retailers categories.

Recent financials 
Revenue in millions of US dollars.

Annual Income Statement  Annual Income Statements through 2017.

2016 New Vehicle Revenue: $4,938,436, Used Vehicle Revenue: $2,226,951

In April 2008, Lithia posts $1.9 million loss in 1Q. 2010 data is 1Q only SEC filings.

In Q1 2015, the company had a net income of $36.9 million.

Community programs 
Since 1946, Lithia has been dedicated to making the communities they serve better places to live, work and play. Through Lithia 4Kids, they create strategic partnerships with select not-for-profit organizations. The Lithia 4Kids program believes the children within their communities are key to the future. "Educate, Advocate, Support and Strength" are the pillars of the Lithia 4Kids initiative. Lithia, DCH Auto Group, Carbone Auto Group and their stores support multiple organizations. Collaborating with their vendor partners, Lithia Motors, Inc. has contributed more than $1.4 million to the Southern Oregon University Raider Scholarship Fund.

In 2015, Lithia hosted its first Women in Leadership Conference as a way to help empower female staff members and further their professional skills in a field that has been predominantly male. Lithia flew in female managers from across the country with the goal to pursue higher advancement within the company and to inspire more females to seek careers in the industry.  The conference was such a success that it became an annual event.

See also 
 List of companies based in Oregon
 Car dealerships in the United States

References

External links 

American companies established in 1946
Auto dealerships of the United States
Companies based in Medford, Oregon
Retail companies established in 1946
1946 establishments in Oregon
Companies listed on the New York Stock Exchange
1996 initial public offerings